The following is a list of Michigan State Historic Sites in Grand Traverse County, Michigan. Sites marked with a dagger (†) are also listed on the National Register of Historic Places in Grand Traverse County, Michigan.


Current listings

See also
 National Register of Historic Places listings in Grand Traverse County, Michigan

Sources
 Historic Sites Online – Grand Traverse County. Michigan State Housing Developmental Authority. Accessed January 23, 2011.

References

Grand Traverse County
State Historic Sites
Tourist attractions in Grand Traverse County, Michigan